Henry Danger is an American comedy television series created by Dan Schneider and Dana Olsen that aired on Nickelodeon from July 26, 2014 to March 21, 2020. The series stars Jace Norman, Cooper Barnes, Riele Downs, Sean Ryan Fox, Ella Anderson, and Michael D. Cohen.

Series overview

Episodes

Season 1 (2014–15)

Season 2 (2015–16)

Season 3 (2016–17)

Season 4 (2017–18)

Season 5 (2018–20)

See also 
 List of Henry Danger characters

Notes

References 

Lists of American children's television series episodes
Lists of American comedy television series episodes
Lists of Nickelodeon television series episodes